Vale Callampa is an EP from the Mexican band Café Tacvba. It was released in 2002 and is Café Tacvba's second cover album. Their first, Avalancha de Éxitos, consisted of eight songs from various artists. Vale Callampa, however, is all a tribute to one of Café Tacvba's favorite bands, a Chilean rock group called Los Tres. This album contains "Déjate Caer", a Los Tres cover, which became a major hit for Café Tacvba due to major airplay as well as for its music video, directed by Ángel Flores-Torres.

Track listing

Band members
 Rita Cantalagua a.k.a. Gallo Gasss (Rubén Albarrán): vocals
 Emmanuel Del Real: keyboards, programming, jarana, percussions, and background vocals
 Joselo Rangel: guitar and background vocals
 Quique Rangel: bass and background vocals

References

External links 
 Vale Callampa on Yahoo! Music

Café Tacuba albums
2002 EPs
Albums produced by Gustavo Santaolalla